State Route 147 (SR 147) is an east–west state highway that traverses Benton County in West Tennessee and Houston County in Middle Tennessee.

Route description

Benton County

SR 147 begins in Benton County in West Tennessee in downtown Big Sandy at an intersection with SR 69A. It goes north as Main Street before curving east onto Front Street, then turns north onto 2nd Street, crosses a bridge over a creek, before turning east onto Lick Creek Road to leave Big Sandy. SR 147 then comes to a Y-Intersection where it becomes Danville Road. The highway then passes through wooded areas as it turns northeast and becomes curvy before reaching the Danville Ferry to cross Kentucky Lake/Tennessee River into Houston County and Middle Tennessee.

Houston County

SR 147 continues east to pass through McKinnon, where it passes by Houston County Airport and has an intersection with SR 232, before passing through the community of Stewart. SR 147 continues east to enter Tennessee Ridge, where it passes through downtown before coming to an end at an intersection with SR 49.

Major intersections

References 

147
Transportation in Benton County, Tennessee
Transportation in Houston County, Tennessee